Chiesina Uzzanese is a comune (municipality) in the Province of Pistoia in the Italian region Tuscany, located about  west of Florence and about  southwest of Pistoia.   

Chiesina Uzzanese borders the following municipalities: Altopascio, Buggiano, Fucecchio, Montecarlo, Pescia, Ponte Buggianese, Uzzano.

Twin towns
Chiesina Uzzanese is twinned with:

  Saint-Memmie, France

People
 Agostino Giuntoli, nightclub owner

References

External links

 Official website
Tourism of Chiesina Uzzanese

Cities and towns in Tuscany